DJ-Kicks: Annie is a DJ mix album, mixed by Norwegian recording artist Annie. It was released on 17 October 2005 on the Studio !K7 independent record label as part of the DJ-Kicks series.

The previously unreleased track "Wedding" was offered as a free download prior to the album's release.

Track listing

Notes
 JD Twitch is misspelled as DJ Twitch on the CD inlay.

Personnel
Credits adapted from DJ-Kicks: Annie album liner notes.

 Annie – vocals (7, 10, 12); producer (7, 12); compilation producer, DJ mix, selection
 Patrick Adams – producer (11)
 Svein Berge – producer (7)
 Alan Braxe – remix (8)
 Torbjørn Brundtland – producer (7)
 Jim Butler – notes
 Greg Carmichael – producer (11)
 Klaus Dahmen – art direction
 Lawrence Davis – producer (15)
 Mark Dodson – associate producer (13)
 Ercola – producer (9); DJ mix, editing
 Fred Falke – remix (8)
 Maurice Fulton – producer (16)
 Junior Senior – remix (4)
 Timo Kaukolampi – producer (9, 12); DJ mix, editing

 Paul Klein – producer (15)
 Antti Koivisto – producer (9)
 Kenny Laguna – producer (13)
 Le Tigre – producers (4)
 Steve Leeds – associate producer (13)
 Nicole Naumann – hair, make-up
 Yngve Sætre – producer (17)
 Charlus de la Salle – digital remastering (2)
 Nick Sansano – producer (4)
 Steviant – additional vocals (5)
 Alisdair Stirling – producer (1)
 Joseph Louis Stone – producer (15)
 Valerie Stahl von Stromberg – photography
 Will Sweeney – additional guitar (5)
 Jørgen Træen – producer (1)
 JD Twitch – editing (6)

References

External links
 

2005 compilation albums
Annie (singer) albums
Annie